Berghia dakariensis is a species of sea slug, an aeolid nudibranch. It is a shell-less marine gastropod mollusc in the family Aeolidiidae.

Distribution
This species was described from Senegal, West Africa. Baeolidia benteva was described from the Caribbean Sea and is currently considered to be a synonym of this species. Carmona et al. considered S. dakariensis to be a nomen dubium since “some forms of Spurilla neapolitana, Spurilla sp. A and Spurilla braziliana could be attributed to Spurilla dakariensis. Additionally, it has been shown that the radular morphology of aeolidiids does not allow unequivocal identification of species."

Description 
The maximum recorded body length is 19 mm.

Habitat 
Minimum recorded depth is 0 m. Maximum recorded depth is 0 m.

References

Aeolidiidae
Gastropods described in 1953